Adam LeBor is a British author, journalist, writing coach and editorial trainer. Born in London in 1961, he worked as a foreign correspondent from 1991 for many years but is now based in London. Mostly based in Budapest, he also lived in Berlin and Paris and spent substantial amounts of time reporting from the former Yugoslavia. 

He covered the collapse of Communism and the Yugoslav wars for The Independent and The Times and has worked in more than thirty countries, some of which inspired his book writing. He currently contributes to The Times, the Financial Times, where he reviews thrillers, The Critic, Monocle and several other publications. He works as an editorial trainer and writing coach at the Financial Times, Citywire and Monocle. He also writes for Harry's Place.

LeBor has written eight non-fiction books, including Hitler's Secret Bankers, which exposed Swiss complicity with the Nazis and which was shortlisted for the Orwell Prize, a biography of Slobodan Milosevic, and City of Oranges, an account of Jewish and Arab families in Jaffa, which was shortlisted for the Jewish Quarterly Prize. His books have been published in fourteen languages including Chinese, Hebrew and Japanese.

Thrillers
He has written seven novels including Dohany Street, District VIII and Kossuth Square, a trilogy featuring Balthazar Kovacs, a Gypsy detective in the Budapest police murder squad, and a trilogy of thrillers featuring Yael Azoulay, an Israeli woman who works as the secret negotiator for the United Nations Secretary General. LeBor's first novel, the Budapest Protocol was partly inspired by a US military intelligence document, Intelligence Report EW-Pa 128, dated 27 November 1944, datelined London, which was declassified by the US National Archives in 1996. The document, known as the Red House Report, also featured in LeBor's non-fiction work, Hitler's Secret Bankers. The Red House Report is based on information supplied by an agent of French intelligence, who attended a meeting of Nazi officials and German industrialists at the Maison Rouge (Red House) hotel in Strasbourg on 10 August 1944. The report, a copy of which is included in The Budapest Protocol, outlines the industrialists' plans for the post-war resurrection of Germany. While some have questioned the document's authenticity, it includes the date of declassification, 6 May 1996, and the authorisation code: NND765055. National Archives and Records Administration archivist Tom McAnear identified the series (NND 765055) noting that it refers to over 2,000 boxes and declared that without more information in the way of a citation there is no way to easily locate this document or verify authenticity.

Non-fiction works 
LeBor's first non-fiction book, A Heart Turned East, published in 1997, examined the lives of Muslim minorities in Europe and the United States. His other non-fiction titles include:

Hitler's Secret Bankers, first published in 1997 updated in 1999 and again in 2020, exposed Swiss economic and political complicity with Nazi Germany and was shortlisted for the Orwell Prize.

Seduced By Hitler, published in 2000, co-authored with Roger Boyes, examined daily life under the Third Reich.

Milosevic: A Biography, published in 2002, recounted the life of the former Serbian President.

City of Oranges: Arabs and Jews in Jaffa, published in 2006, portrayed the lives of Arab and Jewish families in Jaffa, Israel and was shortlisted for the Jewish Quarterly Wingate Prize. The book was re-published in 2017 by Head of Zeus, with a lengthy new afterword that updates the story of the featured families and Jaffa. LeBor co-wrote and presented Jaffa Stories, a documentary for the BBC based on this book.

Complicity with Evil: The United Nations in the Age of Modern Genocide, published in 2006, investigated the failure of the United Nations to stop genocide in Bosnia, Rwanda and Darfur, especially focusing on the role of U.N. officials.

The Believers: How America fell for Bernard Madoff's $65 billion Investment Scam, published in 2009, examined the psychology of the Madoff fraud.

LeBor's most recent non-fiction book, Tower of Basel: The Shadowy History of the Secret Bank that Runs the World, published in 2013, is the first investigative history of the Bank for International Settlements.

References

External links

English writers
Living people
1961 births